Promate is a Taiwanese electronics manufacturing company that develops mainly computing, communications and consumer electronics but also engages in the development, design and manufacturing of computer and mobile accessories. Promate produces personal computer peripherals, MFi certified product, mobile and smartphone accessories, USB products, power banks, universal power adaptors, audio devices, digital gadgets, LED, wired microphone and Solar lights and photography accessories. Founded in 2004, the company is headquartered right now in Shenzhen, China.

History
Promate Technologies was founded in early 2004 in Taipei, Taiwan by a group of industry leaders working at ASUS, Foxconn, and Pegatron. The company later moved its headquarter to Shenzhen, China and set up its manufacturing facilities on a large scale.

In 2006, Promate established its first overseas branch office in Dubai – UAE to serve the rapidly growing demand in the Middle East and Africa region, the MEA branch office is located in jebel Ali free zone with 5,000 Square Meters warehousing facility catering to more than 45 markets in MEA and staffed with 130+ personnel's.

In 2008, Promate became an Apple MFi Certified brand with a dedicated R&D and Design center in Shenzhen-China.

In 2010, Promate established a fully-fledged branch office in Manila – Philippines to serve the South east Asia region.

In 2013, Promate established a fully-fledged branch office in London – United Kingdom.

Products
Promate produces a variety of products. It mostly produces lifestyle technology accessories and peripherals ranging from smartphones, laptops to mobile car accessories. Its products also include power banks, chargers, speakers, earphones, headphones, universal power adaptors, bluetooth adaptors, card readers, mini projectors, cables, tripods, monopods, bag packs, wearable tech, selfie lights, LED lights, screen protectors, car holders, bike holders, iPhone cases, iPad cases, Macbook cases, travel kits etc.

Operation
Promate operates in over 150 countries worldwide through offline distribution, retail and e-commerce channels.

Awards and recognition
Promate has received a number of design and product awards that include;

 iF Product Design Award, Germany 2014–2018, (5 times) 
 CES Best Innovation Award 2015
 Japan RedDot Award in 2017
 Retail Brand of year Award 2015
 Taiwan Excellence Awards, 2006–2014, (7 times)
 Distree EMEA Diamond Awards, 2018
 DISTREE Middle East Awards 2017 - Best Product Design 
 EMEA Channel Academy 2014 Award - PC Accessories Vendor of the Year, nominated 
 CES Innovation Awards Honorees, 2018
 Good Design Award (Japan), 2013 - Best Communication device 
 Computex D&I Awards, 2013
 Taiwan Excellence Awards, 2009
 Business Channel Awards, 2012
 Brand of year Award 2016
 Business Channel Awards 2009

References

External links
Official website

Taiwanese brands
Manufacturing companies based in Shenzhen
Mobile technology companies
Computer peripheral companies
Electronics companies established in 2004
Computer companies established in 2004
Music equipment manufacturers
Electronics companies of Taiwan